House of Darkness may refer to:

  House of Darkness (1948 film), a British film directed by Oswald Mitchell
 The House of Darkness, a 1913 American silent film
 House of Darkness, a 2016 film with Sara Fletcher
  House of Darkness (2022 film), a film directed by Neil LaBute